The Liwale round-snouted worm lizard (Loveridgea ionidesii) is a worm lizard species in the family Amphisbaenidae. It is found in Tanzania.

References

Loveridgea
Endemic fauna of Tanzania
Reptiles of Tanzania 
Reptiles described in  1950
Taxa named by James Clarence Battersby